Pontelongo is a comune (municipality) in the Province of Padua in the Italian region Veneto, located about  southwest of Venice and about  southeast of Padua.

Pontelongo borders the following municipalities: Arzergrande, Bovolenta, Brugine, Candiana, Codevigo, Correzzola, Piove di Sacco.

Demographic evolution

References

External links
 www.comune.pontelongo.pd.it/
 www.pontelongo.org/

Cities and towns in Veneto